The University of Baguio (UB; Filipino: Pamantasan ng Baguio), formerly Baguio Technical and Commercial Institute (Baguio Tech), is a private, Filipino, multidisciplinary, autonomous university in Baguio, Philippines. It was founded by Fernando Gonzaga Bautista and Rosa Castillo Bautista on August 8, 1948, with 80 students. The student population in 2018 was about 18,000 in its tertiary level.

History

Founding 
The Baguio Technical and Commercial Institute, also known as Baguio Tech, was founded on August 8, 1948 by Fernando Bautista and his wife Rosa Bautista. It first offered tertiary programs in 1950. It received university status in 1969 and was named University of Baguio.

1990 earthquake 
The University of Baguio was affected by the 1990 Luzon earthquake. 23 people were reported dead when a building at the university collapsed. Students jumped screaming from the 10-storey commerce building of the university as it began to shake, and the floors collapsed.

Following the earthquake, the University of Baguio implemented a take home learning system, and formal classes resumed in October 1990.

Recent developments 
The university was given autonomous status by the Commission on Higher Education in 2016.

Organization and administration 
The University of Baguio is governed by a board of directors. Its current chairperson is Zorba Bnn R. Bautista.

The university is a member of the following associations:

 Philippine Association of Colleges and Universities (PACU)
 Philippine Association of Colleges and Universities Commission on Accreditation (PACUCOA)
 Baguio-Benguet Educational Athletic League (BBEAL)

Academics

The University of Baguio offers 21 undergraduate programs, 12 graduate programs, and 10 short-term programs across 11 colleges; a Preparatory High School; Science High School; and a Grade School. It has grown to be an institution of close to 18,000 students and more than 400 faculty members.

During its 65th anniversary in 2013, the university is the first HEI that offered Forensic Science program in the country. It also offered the first Music program in Northern Luzon.

The university has facilities and equipment such as science, technical, and computer laboratories; libraries; multi-purpose and function halls; an audio-visual center; a 3,500-seat gymnasium and a fitness gym; a 25m size swimming pool; a dental/medical laboratory, x-ray laboratory; a research center; and a community outreach center.

Schools (Higher education)
Business Administration and Accountancy
Criminal Justice and Public Safety
Dentistry
Engineering and Architecture
Liberal Arts and Human Sciences
International Hospitality and Tourism Management
Law
Natural Sciences
Nursing
Teacher Education and Liberal Arts

Basic education

University of Baguio Laboratory Elementary School
The University of Baguio Laboratory Elementary School is the basic education unit of the university offering programs from kindergarten to Grade 6.

University of Baguio Preparatory High School 
The University of Baguio High School, also known as UB High School, is the mother-department of the University of Baguio. The high school department was established at the same year as university in 1948.

University of Baguio Science High School

The University of Baguio Science High School, otherwise known as Science High, is the science department of the university. In 1963, sixth grade students from the high school (and some from the city) took a special examination. Passers of the test were put in one class called the Special Science Scholars Section or SSSS. Following the test, an annual scholarship examination was administered for the best and brightest pupils. Thus, in 1967, the University of Baguio Science High School ushered its first graduates. In 1970, the UB Science High Schools received its legal recognition.

The first true high school varsity team is the Greyhounds. The first mixed youth choir in Baguio is the Sonus Juventus. The first socially relevant programs conducted in a secondary school is the Immersion Camps and Outreach.

Research 
The Research and Development Center is the research unit of the university. It was established on May 3, 1966, and published the Baguio Tech Journal. It is devoted to research on the culture of ethnic groups in the region and on issues on education in Northern Luzon. Upon reaching university status in 1969, the journal was renamed to University of Baguio Research Journal.

Athletics
The University of Baguio is home to an assortment of athletic organizations. The UB Cardinals is the head name of many teams in the school: basketball, volleyball, table tennis, badminton, chess, and athletics. Football was once a major sport in the university but was removed recently.

UB is in partnership with the multi-award-winning taekwondo team of Baguio, the Baguio Defenders. UB has a national award-winning team of Arnisadors or Arnis players and judo players.

The university is a member of the Baguio-Benguet Educational Athletic League or BBEAL along with several top universities in the city.

Notable alumni 
Nesthy Petecio - Tokyo 2020 Olympics silver medalist in boxing

Carlo Paalam - Tokyo 2020 Olympics silver medalist in boxing

Eumir Marcial - Tokyo 2020 Olympics bronze medalist in boxing

External links

References

Universities and colleges in Baguio
Nursing schools in the Philippines
Dental schools in the Philippines
Educational institutions established in 1948
1948 establishments in the Philippines